Charles Tanfield (born 17 November 1996) is a British racing cyclist, who rides for UCI Continental team .
He competed at the 2020 Summer Olympics in Tokyo in the team pursuit.

Career
He rode in the men's team pursuit event at the 2018 UCI Track Cycling World Championships, winning the gold medal. Tanfield won silver in the team pursuit and gold in the individual pursuit at the 2018 Commonwealth Games where he set of time of 4:11.455, the third fastest individual pursuit time in history. Tanfield went on to claim a second silver in the team pursuit at the 2022 Commonwealth Games.

Tanfield won two more national titles at the 2023 British Cycling National Track Championships bringing his total to five at the time. He won the individual pursuit for the second time and the team pursuit for the third time.

Personal life
His brother Harry Tanfield is also a cyclist and a silver medalist at the 2018 Commonwealth Games road time trial. They are both born on the same day two years apart.

Major results

2017
 National Track Championships
1st  Team pursuit
2nd Individual pursuit
 3rd Time trial, National Under-23 Road Championships
 5th Duo Normand (with Harry Tanfield)
2018
 1st  Team pursuit, UCI Track World Championships
 Commonwealth Games
1st  Individual pursuit
2nd  Team pursuit
8th Time trial
 UCI Track World Cup, Minsk
1st Individual pursuit
1st Team pursuit
 National Track Championships
1st  Individual pursuit
2nd Team pursuit
 1st  Time trial, National Under-23 Road Championships
 3rd  Team pursuit, UEC European Track Championships
2019
 1st  Team pursuit, National Track Championships
 2nd  Team pursuit, UCI Track World Championships
 3rd  Team pursuit, UEC European Track Championships
2021
 1st Castle Douglas, Tour Series
 3rd  Team pursuit, UCI Track World Championships
 3rd  Team pursuit, UEC European Track Championships
2022
 UCI Track Nations Cup, Glasgow
2nd Team pursuit
3rd Individual pursuit
 2nd  Team pursuit, Commonwealth Games
 2nd Individual pursuit,  National Track Championships
 3rd  Team pursuit, UEC European Track Championships
2023
 National Track Championships
1st  Individual pursuit
1st  Team pursuit
 2nd  Team pursuit, UEC European Track Championships
 3rd  Team Pursuit, UCI Track Cycling Nations Cup, Jakarta

References

External links
 
 
 

1996 births
Living people
British male cyclists
UCI Track Cycling World Champions (men)
Cyclists at the 2018 Commonwealth Games
Commonwealth Games gold medallists for England
Commonwealth Games medallists in cycling
British track cyclists
Olympic cyclists of Great Britain
Cyclists at the 2020 Summer Olympics
Cyclists at the 2022 Commonwealth Games
Commonwealth Games competitors for England
21st-century British people
Medallists at the 2018 Commonwealth Games
Medallists at the 2022 Commonwealth Games